Alexandru Dobra (15 February 1794 – 13 April 1870) was a Romanian Greek Catholic hierarch. He was the first bishop of the new created Romanian Catholic Eparchy of Lugoj from 1854 to 1870.

Born in Șopteriu, Bistrița-Năsăud, Habsburg monarchy (present day – Romania) in 1794, he was ordained a priest on 1 November 1818. He was confirmed the Bishop by the Holy See on 16 November 1854. He was consecrated to the Episcopate on 28 October 1855. The principal consecrator was Archbishop Alexandru Sterca-Șuluțiu, the co-consecrators were Bishop Vasile Erdeli and Bishop Angelo Parsi.

He died in Lugoj (present day – Romania) on 13 April 1870.

References 

1794 births
1870 deaths
People from Bistrița-Năsăud County
19th-century Eastern Catholic bishops
Romanian Greek-Catholic bishops